Stadio Sergio Lanfranchi (or Sergio Lanfranchi Stadium) was a sports stadium in the city of Parma in the Emilia-Romagna region of northern Italy.

The stadium was named after Sergio Lanfranchi (1925-2001), an international rugby union prop from Parma who played for Italy from 1949 to 1961 and spent most of his club career in France.

It was a 3,600 seat arena which hosted Gran Parma Rugby and Rugby Parma F.C. 1931 Rugby Union teams.  It also hosted the Parma Panthers American Football team.  The stadium is described and referenced numerous times in the book Playing for Pizza by John Grisham.

The stadium was demolished in July 2008 because the area was chosen for the Headquarters building of the European Food Safety Authority. Since then, the teams play their home games at the Stadio XXV Aprile.

In January 2015, Stadio XXV Aprile was renamed as the Stadio Sergio Lanfranchi.

References

External links 
 

XXV Aprile
Defunct rugby union venues
Sports venues demolished in 2008
Demolished buildings and structures in Italy